Albert Bond Lambert (December 6, 1875 – November 12, 1946) was an American golfer who competed in the 1900 Summer Olympics and in the 1904 Summer Olympics. He was also a prominent St. Louis aviator and benefactor of aviation.

Early life
He was son of Jordan W. Lambert, founder of Lambert Pharmaceutical Company which made Listerine.  He initially studied at the University of Virginia and became president of the family business in 1896.  He became chairman in 1923 and stepped down in 1926 when it was acquired by another firm.

Golf
At the 1900 Summer Olympics in Paris, France, Lambert finished eighth in the individual event.

Four years later he was part of the American team which won the silver medal, making Lambert the only golfer to have competed in both Olympic golf tournaments. He finished 12th in this competition.

In the individual competition he finished eighth in the qualification and was eliminated in the quarter-finals of the match play.

Aviation

In 1906 he became interested in aviation and took ballooning lessons. In 1907 he was one of the founders of the Aero Club of St. Louis. (The Club used "military" titles; hence Lambert's title "Major.") He attended the Smith Academy at Washington University in St. Louis

In 1909, Lambert met the Wright Brothers, and purchased his first airplane from them. He took flying lessons from Orville Wright, and in 1911 became the first St. Louis resident to hold a pilot's license. During World War I, he served in the Aviation Section of the United States Army Signal Corps, as an instructor in ballooning and parachuting.

One of Lambert's first flight instructors was Orville Wright. In 1926, a young Charles Lindbergh visited this home while looking for financial support for his proposed transatlantic flight.  Lambert offered financial support to Lindbergh and encouraged others to do the same. In return for this financial support, Lindbergh's plane was named The Spirit of St. Louis.  Furthermore, St. Louis' Lambert Airport was later named after Albert Bond Lambert.

In 1925, for $68,000, Lambert purchased Kinloch Field of Kinloch, Missouri, a  field northwest of St. Louis, which had been used for hot air balloon ascensions and the first international air meet.

Lambert, at his own expense, developed the field with runways and hangars. In 1927 he was one of the St. Louis committee of backers of Charles Lindbergh's purchasing of his airplane The Spirit of St. Louis for his epoch-making transatlantic solo trip to Paris. Lindbergh was at the time a resident of St. Louis as well as an airmail pilot flying the mail between St. Louis and Chicago. The following year, 1928, Lambert sold the field to the city of St. Louis for $68,000, the same price he had paid for it before making improvements. St. Louis Lambert International Airport thus became one of the first municipal airports in the nation.

Family
Lambert was married to Myrtle McGrew, daughter of the George F. McGrews of St. Louis. They had a daughter, Myrtle and sons, Albert Bond Lambert Jr., Don L. Lambert and George Lea Lambert. George, a pilot instructor, died in an airplane accident on July 29, 1929 in St. Louis, Missouri.

Residence
2 Hortense Place was the Lamberts' home in St. Louis, Missouri.

The Albert Bond Lambert House is a red-brick and symmetrical mansion which has a two-story portico with columns.  The nearly 12,000 square foot Neoclassical-style home was designed by noted architect George W. Hellmuth and was built between 1902 and 1903.  It has 6 bedrooms and 8 bathrooms.  Before construction, its cost was estimated to be $45,000. This home was constructed just before the 1904 World's Fair.  The King of Sweden also visited this house with the fireplace in the solarium apparently being a gift from the king.

References

External links

Albert Bond Lambert at earlyaviators.com
History of St. Louis Lambert International Airport
Lambert and Orville Wright sitting aboard a Wright A-B transitional aircraft c.1910 original version Corbis(Wayback Machine archived)

American male golfers
Golfers at the 1900 Summer Olympics
Golfers at the 1904 Summer Olympics
Olympic silver medalists for the United States in golf
Medalists at the 1904 Summer Olympics
Golfers from St. Louis
American aviators
American police chiefs
Members of the Early Birds of Aviation
Smith Academy (Missouri) alumni
Burials at Bellefontaine Cemetery
1875 births
1946 deaths